Saidabad (also Romanized as Sa‘īdābād; also known as Nāderābād) is a village in Qaleh Darrehsi Rural District, in the Central District of Maku County, West Azerbaijan Province, Iran. At the 2006 census, its population was 14, in 4 families.

References 

Populated places in Maku County